Bunbury Aldersey School is a 5–11 mixed, Church of England primary school with academy status in Bunbury, Cheshire, England. It is located in the Diocese of Chester and recorded in the National Heritage List for England as a designated Grade II listed building.

History 
The school was built in 1874 and designed by the Chester architect John Douglas.  It was built as a grammar school to replace a school nearer to Bunbury Church, which had been founded in 1594 by Thomas Aldersey. It later became a primary school.

Architecture 
The school is constructed in red brick on a sandstone plinth and has a slate roof. Its style is Gothic Revival, and it is built in one storey with five bays. The entrance bay projects forwards and its opening has a Tudor arch, over which is the date 1874 and shields containing inscriptions. Above this is a gable with a finial. On the roof are lucarnes and an octagonal slate turret.

See also 

 Listed buildings in Bunbury, Cheshire
 List of non-ecclesiastical and non-residential works by John Douglas

References

External links 
 

Grade II listed buildings in Cheshire
School buildings completed in 1874
Primary schools in the Borough of Cheshire East
Academies in the Borough of Cheshire East
John Douglas buildings
Church of England primary schools in the Diocese of Chester